Jason Barrett may refer to:

 Jason Barrett (actor) (born 1976), Jamaican-British actor and mixed martial artist
 Jason Barrett (West Virginia politician) (born 1982), member of the West Virginia House of Delegates
 Jason Barrett (Mississippi politician) (born 1978), member of the Mississippi State Senate